Montreal Chest Institute is a health centre in Montreal specializing in respiratory medicine. It is affiliated with the Royal Victoria Hospital, and by extension, McGill University Health Centre. On June 14, 2015, the historic Institute moved into the new MUHC Glen Site.

See also
 Montreal Heart Institute

Hospitals in Montreal
Côte-des-Neiges–Notre-Dame-de-Grâce
McGill University buildings